Abdul Aziz Junejo is a Pakistani politician who had been a Member of the Provincial Assembly of Sindh, from May 2016 to May 2018.

Early life and education
He was born on 7 December 1961.

He has done Bachelor of Engineering from N.E.D Engineering University Karachi.

Political career

He was elected to the Provincial Assembly of Sindh as a candidate of Pakistan Peoples Party (PPP) from Constituency PS-76 Dadu-III in by-polls held in May 2016.

He was re-elected to Provincial Assembly of Sindh as a candidate of PPP from Constituency PS-83 (Dadu-I) in 2018 Pakistani general election.

References

Living people
Sindh MPAs 2013–2018
1961 births
Pakistan People's Party MPAs (Sindh)
Sindh MPAs 2018–2023